The 2002 WNBA season was the fifth for the Washington Mystics. This was the first time in franchise history (and, until 2017, the only) that the Mystics won a playoff series. 
None of Washington's "big four" teams would accomplish the feat of reaching the semifinals in their respective leagues until the Washington Capitals won their first Stanley Cup, with the only trips to the semifinals between Capitals' Stanley Cups being this season and 2017 for the Mystics.

Offseason

WNBA Draft

Regular season

Season standings

Season schedule

Player stats
Note: GP= Games played; MIN= Minutes; REB= Rebounds; AST= Assists; STL = Steals; BLK = Blocks; PTS = Points; AVG = Average

Playoffs
Won WNBA Eastern Conference Semifinals (2-0) over Charlotte Sting
Lost WNBA Eastern Conference Finals (2-1) to New York Liberty

Awards and honors
Coco Miller, WNBA Most Improved Player Award
 Chamique Holdsclaw, WNBA Peak Performer
Marianne Stanley, WNBA Coach of the Year Award

References

External links
Washington Mystics on Basketball Reference

Washington Mystics seasons
Washington
Washington Mystics